Jersey Legal French, also known as Jersey French, was the official dialect of French used administratively in Jersey. Since the anglicisation of the island, it survives as a written language for some laws, contracts, and other documents. Jersey's parliament, the States of Jersey, is part of the Assemblée parlementaire de la Francophonie. The use of the English language has been allowed in legislative debates since 2 February 1900; the current use of French in the States of Jersey is generally restricted to certain limited official state functions and formalities (prayers, ceremonies, formulæ).

By common custom and usage, the sole official language of Jersey in present times is the English language.

Jersey Legal French is not to be confused with Jèrriais, a variety of the Norman language also called Jersey Norman-French, spoken on the island.

The French of Jersey differs little from that of France. It is characterised by several terms particular to Jersey administration and a few expressions imported from Norman.

List of distinguishing features

Initial capital letters are commonly used in writing the names of the days of the week and months of the year.

Finance

Agriculture

Administration

Real estate

Influence of Jersey Legal French on Jersey English
Jersey English has imported a number of Jersey Legal French titles and terminology. Many of these, in turn, derive from Jèrriais.  The following are examples likely to be encountered in daily life and in news reports in Jersey: rapporteur, en défaut (in default, i.e. late for a meeting), en désastre, au greffe, greffier (clerk to Court or the States), bâtonnier (lawyer in charge of Bar, particularly for legal aid), mandataire, autorisé (returning officer at elections, or other functions), projet (parliamentary bill), vraic, côtil, temps passé (time past), vin d'honneur (municipal or official reception), Centenier, Vingtenier, Chef de Police (senior Centenier), Ministre Desservant, branchage (pronounced in English as the Jèrriais cognate even though spelt in the French manner – trimming hedges and verges on property border; also used jocularly for a haircut), Seigneur (feudal lord of the manor).

References

A Glossary for the Historian of Jersey, Chris Aubin, 2000, 

French
Jersey law
French dialects